Erdinci Septar (born 12 February 1973 in Constanța) is a former Romanian rugby union football player. He played as a number eight but also as a flanker.

Club career
He mostly played for Farul Constanța but also in France for Limoges and Saint-Junien.

International career
Septar gathered 13 test caps for Romania, from his debut in 1996 to his last test in 2000. He scored 3 tries during his international career, 15 points on aggregate. He was a member of his national side for the 4th  Rugby World Cups in 1999 playing in all three Pool E matches.

Personal life
Erdinci Septar is the father of French-Romanian Rugby Union player, Atila Septar.

External links
Erdinci Septar International Statistics at ESPN
Erdinci Septar's Profile at It'srugby

References

1973 births
Living people
Romanian rugby union players
Romania international rugby union players
Rugby union number eights
Rugby union flankers
RCJ Farul Constanța players
Sportspeople from Constanța
Romanian people of Crimean Tatar descent